Hector Denis (3 November 1900 – 1 May 1959) was a French racing cyclist. He rode in the 1928 Tour de France.

References

1900 births
1959 deaths
French male cyclists
Place of birth missing